A by-election for the Tokyo 10th district in the Japanese Japanese House of Representatives was held on 23 October 2016 to replace Yuriko Koike, who vacated the seat to contest the Tokyo gubernatorial election in July 2016. Koike, a member of the Liberal Democratic Party (LDP), had represented the district since the December 2012 general election and also served a previous term from 2005 to 2009. The election was won by LDP candidate Masaru Wakasa, an incumbent member for the Tokyo proportional representation block who had supported Koike during her gubernatorial campaign. A separate by-election for the Fukuoka 6th district was held on the same day.

Background
Koike defeated Kobayashi in the 2005 election but lost to Democratic Party of Japan (DPJ) candidate Takako Ebata in 2009. Koike regained the seat from Ebata at the 2012 election and retained it at the 2014 general election.

Tokyo governor Yoichi Masuzoe resigned in June 2016 due to various problems with his use of public funds. On 29 June Koike held a press conference and stated her intention to contest the gubernatorial election to replace Masuzoe that was scheduled for 31 July. On 5 July Koike met with Nobuteru Ishihara, the head of the LDP's Tokyo branch, to formally request the LDP's endorsement. However, with the branch planning to endorse former Iwate Prefecture governor Hiroya Masuda, Ishihara's response to Koike was that the branch would make a decision after the national House of Councillors election on 10 July.

Candidates

Results

References 

2016 elections in Japan
2016
October 2016 events in Japan
2016 in Tokyo

ja:2016年日本の補欠選挙#衆議院東京都第10区